The type IV filament superfamily (TFF) is a group of fibrous protein structures that includes a set of cell projections with evolutionarily related membrane proteins. The TFF family seems to have originated in the last universal common ancestor, from where it diversified into archaella, type IV pili, type II secretion systems, and the Tad pili.

Complexes in the TFF superfamily are unified by the presence of the eponymous type IV pilin, an AAA+ ATPase, an integral (cytoplasmic) membrane (IM) platform, and (with the exception of MSH) a prepilin peptidase.

References 

Bacteriology
Protein complexes